Star Wars: Ambush at Corellia is a novel written by Roger MacBride Allen in 1995. The book was published by Bantam Books under the imprint Spectra. Ambush at Corellia takes place in the Star Wars universe, in the Star Wars Legends canon, 14 years after the 1983 film Return of the Jedi.

Plot Summary
14 years after Return of the Jedi, a New Republic Intelligence agent comes to Han telling him that they have a hidden enemy and none of the spies for the New Republic have reported back from Corellia. The agent asks Han to fulfill a mission for the Republic. But when Han goes to his home planet Corellia, he learns that the system of Corellia, consisting of several planets, is on the brink of civil war.
Suddenly, Han, Leia, an their children are in a very dangerous position. The only visible way out is to meet a rebel leader's impossible demands. And with no way to contact Luke Skywalker, Han and Leia are on their own.

Characters
Han Solo
Leia Organa
Jacen Solo
Jaina Solo
Anakin Solo
Chewbacca
Luke Skywalker

Publishing
Ambush at Corellia was published on February 2, 1995, by Bantam Books, under the imprint Bantam Spectra. According to the inside cover of the book, its paperback ISBN number is 0553298038.

See also
List of Star Wars books
Roger MacBride Allen

References

Sources
Ambush at Corellia paperback book

Star Wars Legends novels
1995 American novels